Unreported employment, also known as money under the table, working under the table, off the books, cash-in-the-claw, money-in-the-paw, or illicit work is illegal employment that is not reported to the government. The employer or the employee often does so for tax evasion or avoiding and violating other laws such as obtaining unemployment benefits while being employed. The working contract is made without social security costs, and does typically not provide health insurance, paid parental leave, paid vacation or pension funds. It is a part of what has been called the underground economy, shadow economy, black market or the non-observed economy.

Payments are generally in cash, and the employer often does not check the employee's background or credentials, as is sometimes required by law or otherwise expected by the industry's client base, such as a license or professional certification.

While the hiring of the employee may or may not be legal in itself, it is often done when the employer or the employee intentionally fails to obey one or more laws.

In developed nations, unreported employment evades withholding tax and is part of the informal sector. It is hidden from the state for tax, social security, or labor law purposes but is legal in all other aspects.

Common jobs
Common types of employment sectors of unreported jobs include the following:
Domestic work, such as housekeeping, babysitting, or foodservice
Construction work, landscaping, farm work
Taxicab service (sometimes known as hacking)
Various types of self-employment, such as plumbing, electrician, window cleaning, painting and decorating, street market trading, and gardening
Short-term work and day laborers
Short-term youth employment
Barbacking and restaurant work
Human trafficking
Prostitution
Fixing cars, motorcycles, and mopeds

Reasons

Reasons one may work or pay a worker cash-in-hand include:
Avoidance of wage garnishment or payment of child support or alimony
Cheaper workforce and avoidance of minimum wage laws
Convenience for both parties
Elimination of paperwork, bookkeeping, and regulation compliance
Reduced/eliminated expenses or need for bookkeepers, human resource specialists, lawyers, accountants, payroll services, insurance agents and other employment specialists
Not checking or showing a criminal record
Protesting actions or policies of the governing authorities e.g. sovereign citizen movement (see agorism)
Evasion of insurance requirements
Flexibility in hiring short-term employees without excessive overhead or paperwork
Avoid allowable income limits by a person receiving certain benefits, such as unemployment, disability, or public assistance
Fugitive, draft evasion, illegal immigration, prison escape, or organized crime
Tax noncompliance, tax resistance, or social security evasion
 Ability to hire employees according to personal traits not related to suitability for employment (e.g. gender, sexuality, ethnic/religious affiliations etc.)
 Ability to hire those who were formerly qualified, and still potentially able to do the job (e.g. blacklisted, disbarred, forced retirement, struck off, etc.)
 Ability to hire underage, teenage employees without going through child labor laws or hire those below the minimum working age (e.g. for short-term projects)
 Quicker, faster hiring process from application to job attainment.

Disadvantages
Unreported employment can have harmful effects on government, employers, and employees.

Unreported employment directly affects the government's ability to fund resources (government spending). It causes a tax gap by the reducing tax revenue of a government.

A 2005 University of California, Los Angeles, study showed that the economy in California was weakened by more than two million workers being paid without paying taxes. Indeed, it is estimated that over US$214.6 billion went unreported to the IRS last year alone from this.

Those who are employed under the table, including undocumented immigrants, may be denied rights that legally employed workers have, such as minimum wage, various benefits (particularly unemployment benefits), and fair treatment.

Under-the-table employees who lose their jobs may not be entitled to collect unemployment benefits. They have limited causes of action against their employers for mistreatment, on-the-job work accidents, or lack of payment. Employers have limited cause of actions against employees who commit crimes such as embezzlement, theft, or abuse of employer.

If practices are widespread, legitimate businesses may be undercut by and may have difficulty competing with those who employ staff illegally.

Government revenue agencies look for lifestyles out of line with the income reported. They have tools that aid in assessing unreported taxes, which can result in large fines or jail time for the employer.

Advantages

Many entrepreneurs fail to report their first part-time hired employees. The complexity of employment regulations and large amount of paperwork can be daunting, especially when someone is needed for only a few hours a week. That early underground employment may be a vital step in the growth of a healthy open economy.

Day laborers fill immediate gaps during labor shortages in some segments of the construction and landscape industries. Background checks, identification, required paperwork, and government filings for only a day's work can be prohibitive. That encourages unreported employment of short-term laborers.

A large amount of work for only a day or two is unreported. Although nanny laws make allowances for the homeowner, businesses are typically required to fill out and file several hours' worth of paperwork even for an hour's worth of work.

The amounts are too small for tax collecting agencies to pursue and the paperwork too arduous to file and so legitimate micro-employment among businesses is rare. However, it is an important resource for many small businesses.

In professional fields like architecture, or marketing, unreported work is typically the first step to starting a legitimate business.

Again, paperwork, compliance, and knowledge of labor laws are prohibitive for the small amount of work that is performed. Although illegal, side businesses generate relatively little revenue and so are rarely the target of tax enforcers. Eventually, professional employees have enough work to be able to leave their employer and become independent. Then, paperwork is usually filed and self-employment taxes are reported. The business then becomes a legitimate and beneficial part of the economy.

Those who are unlikely to find employment through the reported economy, including those with past criminal records or current warrants as well as illegal immigrants can be reasonably productive and self-sufficient. That keeps them from engaging in less-desirable activities like theft and drug use.

Self-employment in cottage industries is often unreported at first. A home cook, for example, may sell a few pies to friends and co-workers without filing necessary sales taxes or self-employment taxes. Although that is usually illegal, it may lead to a legitimate and beneficial business and is often how small businesses are started.

In some countries, the tax system attempts to set minimum thresholds on the amounts liable. However, there is still the burden of compliance with the bookkeeping requirements to prove that one is exempt.

Short-term youth employment is often unreported but can be very beneficial. A teenager hired to aid in constructing a shed or barn, for example, learns valuable skills and responsibility. Most youth would not be employed for short-term projects if employment had to be reported. Government revenue collectors typically ignore enforcement of such beneficial, unreported employment. Youth-run lemonade stands that have been shut down by police for example have received an enormous amount of bad press and public outcry.

Enforcement
Often, both the employer and employee agree on paying in cash. Frequently, the employer is running an unreported cash-based business. These methods make detection by authorities to be time-consuming and difficult. Most small-scale operations take place without any real enforcement effort. Landscaping is a good example of a cash-based business that is frequently unreported.

In the United States, authorities have focused enforcement resources on large-scale operations like undocumented immigrants who are employed by large companies. Discovery and enforcement of small-scaled unreported employment is typically through a secondary indiscretion like fraud, tax irregularities, and unrelated or partially-related civil/criminal violations of the employer or employee.

Although the federal and/or state government may arrest, prosecute, and imprison an individual for engaging in commerce without the state's approval, the high cost of such enforcement is usually prohibitive and impossible except for the most egregious cases.

Examples

United States
According to a New York Times report in February 2013, the Obama administration had demonstrated a new strategy to curb the employment of undocumented immigrants by focusing on companies that hire them in the first place. By concentrating on the businesses employing the large numbers of unauthorized workers, the number of undocumented immigrants working in the US would drop dramatically. The US government would be doing so in a less confrontational manner than in recent years.

American Apparel incident
In 2009, an U.S. Immigration and Customs Enforcement audit of American Apparel's employment records uncovered discrepancies in the documentation of about 25% of the company's workers, implying mainly that they were undocumented immigrants. American Apparel terminated the employment of about 1,500 employees that September as a result. ICE did not accuse American Apparrel of knowingly employing workers without employment authorization, however, and American Apparel received no fines.

See also

Side job
Informal economy
Black market
Illegal immigration
U.S. Immigration and Customs Enforcement (ICE)

References

External links

Reflections on the Meaning and Measurement of Unobserved Economies:What do we really know about the "Shadow Economy"? by Edgar L.Feige Journal of Tax Administration 2016, Vol. 2, No. 1
US Immigration and working under the table
European Foundation for the Improvement of Living and Working Conditions

Labour law
Tax resistance
Black markets
Employment
Informal economy
Crime